BAP Ferré or Ferré may refer to one the following vessels of the Peruvian Navy, named after Diego Ferré, a Peruvian naval officer:

 Frigate BAP Ferré (F-3), 1947–1966, former Royal Canadian Navy River-class frigate HMCS Poundmaker
 Destroyer , 1973–2007, former Royal Navy Daring-class destroyer HMS Decoy (D106)
 Corvette , in service since 2016, former Korean Navy  ROKS Gyeongju (PCC-758)

Peruvian Navy ship names